The 2020–21 Kennesaw State Owls men's basketball team represented Kennesaw State University in the 2020–21 NCAA Division I men's basketball season. The Owls, led by 2nd-year head coach Amir Abdur-Rahim, played their home games at the KSU Convocation Center in Kennesaw, Georgia as members of the Atlantic Sun Conference. They finished the season 5-19, 2-13 in ASUN Play to finish in last place. They lost in the quarterfinals of the ASUN tournament to Liberty.

Previous season
The Owls finished the 2019–20 season 1–28, 0–16 in ASUN play to finish in last place. In turn, they failed to qualify for the ASUN tournament.

Roster

Schedule and results

|-
!colspan=12 style=| Non-conference regular season

|-
!colspan=12 style=| Atlantic Sun Conference regular season

|-
!colspan=12 style=| Atlantic Sun tournament
|-

|-

Source

References

Kennesaw State Owls men's basketball seasons
Kennesaw State Owls
Kennesaw State Owls men's basketball
Kennesaw State Owls men's basketball